Hypsilurus tenuicephalus is a species of agama found in Indonesia.

References

Hypsilurus
Reptiles described in 2006
Taxa named by Ulrich Manthey
Taxa named by Wolfgang Denzer
Agamid lizards of New Guinea